Contrabandits is a 1967 Australian TV series about the work of the customs department.

References

External links
Contrabandits at IMDb
Contrabandits at AustLit
Contrabandits at Classic Australian TV

Australian Broadcasting Corporation original programming
1960s Australian crime television series
1967 Australian television series debuts
1968 Australian television series endings